Vedado is a central business district and urban neighborhood in the city of Havana, Cuba. Bordered on the east by Calzada de Infanta and Central Havana, and on the west by the Alemendares River and Miramar / Playa district, Vedado is a more modern part of the city than the areas to the east, developed in the first half of the 20th century, during the Republic period. In 2016 it was described by one commentator as the city's "most affluent" section. The main street running east to west is Calle 23, also known as "La Rampa". The northern edge of the district is the waterfront seawall known as the Malecón, a famous and popular place for social gatherings in the city. The area popularly referred to as 'Vedado' consists of the wards (consejos populares) of Vedado, Rampa, Vedado-Malecón and Carmelo, all in the municipality of Plaza de la Revolución.

Notable sites
Among the notable sites in Vedado are the hotels: Hotel Nacional de Cuba (National Hotel), the Havana Libre (former Hilton), Melia Cohiba Hotel and Hotel Riviera.

In addition:
 Colon Cemetery
 FOCSA Building, tallest building in Cuba at 121 m
 Edificio del Seguro Médico, Havana
 López Serrano Building, first skyscraper in Cuba
 Radiocentro CMQ Building
 Coppelia (ice cream parlor)
 Embassy of the United States, Havana
 José Martí Anti-Imperialist Plaza
 Jewish religious centers include the Gran Sinagoga Bet Shalom and the Centro Hebreo Sefaradi
 John Lennon Park, named for the statue of Lennon located there
 Monument to the Victims of the USS Maine
 University of Havana
 National broadcast center for Cuban television.
Cementerio Chino (The Chinese Cemetery)

Nearby neighborhoods include:

 To the east: Central Havana
 To the west: Miramar

Economy
Aero Caribbean has its headquarters in Vedado.

The Venezuelan airline Conviasa has an office in the IACC Building in Vedado.

Government and infrastructure
Instituto de Aeronáutica Civil de Cuba, Cuba's civil aviation authority, has its headquarters in Vedado.

Culture

Gay scene
23rd Street in Vedado is also the centerpoint of the city's gay scene in a country which now grants many rights to LGBT citizens. At night, 23rd St. is reminiscent of a gay district between the Cinema Yara and Coppelia ice cream parlor, and the foot of 23rd at the Malecón, with numerous gay entertainment options nearby such as the Bim Bom outdoor bar and the Las Vegas nightclub. Many of the casas particulares target LGBT clients as customers.

See also

References

Bibliography

External links

 Vedado - EcuRed

Wards of Havana
Gay villages in Cuba